This is a list of national swimming records for Barbados. These are the fastest times ever swum by a swimmer representing the country. 

These records are kept by Barbados's national swimming federation: the Barbados Amateur Swimming Association (BASA).

All records were set in finals unless noted otherwise.

Long Course (50 m)

Men

Women

Mixed relay

Short Course (25 m)

Men

Women

References
general
Barbadian Long Course Records 30 June 2021 updated
Barbadian Short Course Records 30 June 2021 updated
specific

External links
BASA web site

Barbados
Records
Swimming records